"Heartbreak Warfare" is a song by American singer-songwriter John Mayer, featured on his fourth studio album, Battle Studies (2009). Written by Mayer and produced by Mayer and drummer Steve Jordan, the song is the opening track on the album, and was released as the second single from the album on October 19, 2009. The song was featured in the movie Date Night.

Music video
The music video for the song was an "augmented reality". Despite being an expensive venture, the video was successfully completed, and began being previewed on October 19, 2009.

A second music video for the song was released on April 12, 2010.

Personnel

Musicians
 John Mayer – vocals, guitars, production
 Steve Jordan – drums, production
 Pino Palladino – bass
 Jamie Muhoberac – keyboards

Additional personnel
 Chad Franscoviak – engineering
 Martin Pradler – digital editing
 Michael Brauer – mixing
 Ryan Gilligan – mixing assistance
 Greg Calbi – mastering

Chart performance
"Heartbreak Warfare" debuted on the Billboard Hot 100 at number 100. On the week ending January 2, 2010, it re-entered the chart at number 85 and later peaked at number 34.

Weekly charts

Year-end charts

Certifications

References

External links
 "Heartbreak Warfare" music video on YouTube
 Mashable article on augmented reality music video for "Heartbreak Warfare"

2009 singles
2009 songs
Columbia Records singles
John Mayer songs
Music videos directed by Anthony Mandler
Songs written by John Mayer